Aljaž Škorjanec (born 19 February 1990) is a Slovenian dancer and choreographer who has appeared on the BBC series Strictly Come Dancing as a professional dancer. In March 2022 he announced, via his Instagram account, that he was leaving the show.

Career 
Aljaž Škorjanec was born in Ptuj, Slovenia. He is a 19-time Slovenian champion in Ballroom, Latin and Ten Dance. Between 2000 and 2008 his professional partner was Valerija Rahle Mbanwi.

Strictly Come Dancing

In September 2013, Škorjanec became a professional dancer on the eleventh series of the British television show, Strictly Come Dancing. He was partnered with model Abbey Clancy. On 21 December, they won the series. He was the fourth professional to win in his first series of the show.

The following year, he returned for the show's twelfth series, where he was partnered with This Morning presenter, Alison Hammond. They were the sixth couple to be eliminated from the competition.

For the show's thirteenth series, he was partnered with Call the Midwife actress, Helen George. They were eliminated on Week 11 of the competition, leaving in sixth place.

For the show's fourteenth series, he was partnered with model Daisy Lowe.  They were the seventh couple to be eliminated from the competition, leaving in eighth place.

For the show's fifteenth series, he was partnered with actress and former model, Gemma Atkinson. The couple reached the finals, but on the 16 December, they finished as joint runners-up, behind winners Joe McFadden and his professional dance partner, Katya Jones.

For the show's sixteenth series, he was partnered with BBC newsreader and journalist Kate Silverton. The couple were eliminated on week 9 in Blackpool, leaving in eighth place.

For the seventeenth series, he was partnered with socialite and chef, Emma Weymouth. They were eliminated on week 7, leaving in ninth place.

For the eighteenth series, he was partnered with BBC Radio 1 DJ and presenter, Clara Amfo.

For the nineteenth series, he was partnered with Dragons' Den entrepreneur and TV personality, Sara Davies.

Highest and lowest scoring performances per dance

Abbey Clancy
On the eleventh series, Škorjanec was partnered with model Abbey Clancy.

Alison Hammond
On the twelfth series, Škorjanec was partnered with television personality Alison Hammond.

Note: Donny Osmond was a guest judge for the third week

Helen George
On the thirteenth series, Škorjanec was partnered with actress Helen George.

Daisy Lowe
On the fourteenth series, Škorjanec was partnered with model Daisy Lowe.

Gemma Atkinson
On the fifteenth series, Škorjanec was partnered with actress and model Gemma Atkinson.

Kate Silverton
On the sixteenth series, Škorjanec was partnered with journalist and newsreader Kate Silverton.

 Score was awarded by guest judge Alfonso Ribeiro.

Emma Thynn, Viscountess Weymouth
On the seventeenth series, Škorjanec was partnered with model and socialite Emma Thynn, Viscountess Weymouth.

 Score was awarded by guest judge Alfonso Ribeiro.

Clara Amfo
On the eighteenth series, Škorjanec was partnered with radio presenter Clara Amfo.

Score was awarded by guest judge Anton Du Beke.

Sara Davies
On the nineteenth series, Škorjanec was partnered with British businesswoman, Sara Davies.

Dance tours and other professional engagements 
In July 2022 Škorjanec and Janette Manrara announced appearances at the 2023 "Dancing With The Stars Weekends".

In 2020 Škorjanec and Janette Manrara announced dates for their 2021 UK Tour "Remembering The Oscars"

In October 2020, Škorjanec announced a 2021 West End Show "Here Come The Boys".

In 2017 Škorjanec took part in the national Strictly Come Dancing - The Live Tour in 2017 and, with Janette Manrara, announced dates for their 2018 UK Tour "Remembering Fred"

Personal life 

Škorjanec is a fan of FC Barcelona. Škorjanec is married to fellow dancer Janette Manrara. In February 2023, Aljaz and Janette announced that they are expecting their first child in summer 2023 

In 2020, Škorjanec explained his developing psoriasis at age 18, saying: "It affects my confidence and self esteem massively" and adding that it makes him self-conscious. Aljaz started to use natural skincare products and document his journey to raise awareness.

References

External links
 

Slovenian male dancers
Strictly Come Dancing winners
Living people
1990 births
People from Slovenska Bistrica